Ruben Ramos, also known as El Gato Negro, is an American Tejano music performer. Beginning his music career in the late 1960s, Ruben's fame as has grown throughout the years as he formed his own distinct sound of music. In March 1998, Ruben was inducted into the Tejano Music Awards Hall of Fame and later won Best Male Vocalist in 1999. His band, The Mexican Revolution, also won album of the year in 2008. ."

Early life
Ruben Ramos was born in to a family music legacy dating to post-World War I Texas. Ruben's uncles began performing just after the World War I in 1919 as Juan Manuel Perez y Los Serenaders. Meanwhile, Ruben's father, Alfonso Ramos Sr., worked the cotton fields and the railroads; he also played the fiddle while his mother, Elvira Perez, played the guitar at family gatherings. At the end of World War II, Ruben's Uncle Justin re-formed the band as Justin Perez and His Ex-GIs. Ruben's sister Inez had joined the band as singer in 1947. Then, in his early teens, Ruben's older brother Alfonso Ramos Jr. joined their uncle's group.

In the mid 1950s, the band then became the Alfonso Ramos Orchestra. Ruben continued with the band on weekends, increasingly singing English cover R&B tunes, even as he landed a "good job" with the state insurance department. Now, all five Ramos brothers were performing. As the orchestra's drummer, Ruben performed throughout the 1960s with Alfonso's band. The band played a mix of tunes, from cha chas and cumbias to boleros and rancheras. Ruben provided the vocals and the push to many of the English songs the band played.

Career

The "Revolution"
In 1969, Ruben formed a new band dubbed "The Mexican Revolution". He had chosen the name 'Mexican Revolution' was due to the emergence of the Chicano and civil rights movements. During that period, the band played the Chicano circuit that ran from Dallas-Fort Worth to the Rio Grande Valley. By 1981, "Tejano" had become the new term for the music he had been playing, so Ruben changed the band name to the Texas Revolution.

In 1985, Alfonso and Ruben reunited for a series of albums and were both named best vocal duo at the 1987 Tejano music Awards. By this time, Ramos had scored with the regional hit "El Gato Negro" (The Black Cat), which also became his nickname. In the '90s Ruben continued playing with a live horn section, eschewing the trend by many bands to substitute synthesizers and keyboards. Ruben later changed the band's name back to The Mexican Revolution during the early 2000s. Thanks to brother "Pia" Ramos bringing to mind the early battles of the Mexican Revolution which the ancestors of the Perez family had fought in, the band decided to pay homage to the past, by the band changing its name to the Mexican Revolution.

The band consists of: Ruben Ramos (vocals/percussion), Rick Fuentes (accordion/keys/bass/guitar/vocals), Bobby Dominguez (bass), Joe Ramos (guitar/keys/vocals), Christopher Rivera (drums/vocals), Don Wise (tenor saxophone), Fabian Hernandez (alto and tenor saxophones), William "Wild 
Bill" Perkins (trumpet), Duane Hargis (trumpet). Mark Ramos (Ruben's son) is the stage manager and runs the light and special effects show, while 
Ruben's other son, Ruben Renee Ramos, works as sound engineer.

Ruben Ramos & The Mexican Revolution have been nominated for a Grammy Award two years in a row, for the 35th Anniversary album, and for the Viva La Revolucion album. The latter won the 2009 Grammy for "Best Tejano album".

References

External links
Official Ruben Ramos & the Mexican Revolution Website
2009 Grammy

Living people
Year of birth missing (living people)
American male singers
American musicians of Mexican descent
Spanish-language singers of the United States
Tejano musicians
21st-century American politicians